Atlanta Temple may refer to:

Atlanta Georgia Temple, a Church of Jesus Christ of Latter-day Saints temple in Sandy Springs, Georgia
The Temple (Atlanta), a Reform Jewish synagogue in Atlanta